Andres Berumen (born April 5, 1971) is a Mexican former professional baseball pitcher. He played parts of two seasons in Major League Baseball for the San Diego Padres.

Career
Berumen was drafted 27th overall by the Kansas City Royals in 1989. San Diego Padres acquired him from the Florida Marlins, with José Martínez and Trevor Hoffman, for Gary Sheffield and Rich Rodriguez on June 24, 1993. On April 27, 1995, Berumen made his major league debut, becoming the first Tijuana native to reach the majors.

On May 15, 1995, Berumen picked up his only save at the major league level. He pitched a perfect 9th inning to hold down a 7-5 Padres victory over the Cardinals.

Personal life
Born in Tijuana, Berumen moved to the Los Angeles area at the age of 12.

References

External links

1971 births
Living people
Appleton Foxes players
Baseball City Royals players
Baseball players from Baja California
Baseball players from Los Angeles
Broncos de Reynosa players
Gulf Coast Royals players
High Desert Mavericks players
Las Vegas Stars (baseball) players
Major League Baseball pitchers
Major League Baseball players from Mexico
Mexican emigrants to the United States
Mexican League baseball pitchers
Sportspeople from Tijuana
Rancho Cucamonga Quakes players
San Diego Padres players
Sultanes de Monterrey players
Tacoma Rainiers players
Wichita Wranglers players